General elections are expected to be held in the Democratic Republic of the Congo on 20 December 2023 according to the electoral calendar released 26 November 2022 by the Independent National Electoral Commission (CENI).  Simultaneous elections will be held for the President, the 500 members of the National Assembly, the elected members of the 26 provincial assemblies, and, for the first time under the new constitution, members of around 300 commune (municipal) councils.

These elections are the first of the 4th election cycle under the 2006 constitution.  Six more elections will follow in 2024, five of which are indirect.

Schedule
Selected dates from the electoral calendar:
24 December 2022—17 March 2023: Voter registration.
24 December—23 January (30 days): Registration in Kongo Central, Kinshasa, Kwango, Kwilu, Mai-Ndombe, Equateur, Mongala, Nord-Ubangi, Sud-Ubangi and Tshuapa provinces.
25 January—23 February (30 days): Registration in Kasaï, Kasaï-Central, Kasaï-Oriental, Lomami, Sankuru, Haut-Lomami, Haut-Katanga, Lualaba and Tanganyika provinces; also for expatriates in South Africa, Belgium, and France.
16 February—17 March (30 days): Registration in Bas-Uélé, Haut-Uélé, Ituri, Tshopo, North Kivu, South Kivu, and Maniema provinces; also for expatriates in Canada and the United States.
21 May 2023: Publication of registration statistics per electoral district—registration totals will determine the size of the provincial assemblies and of the local councils (commune, sector, and chiefdom councils).  They are also used to apportion seats to electoral districts.
23 May 2023—15 June 2023: Proportional allocation of seats to electoral districts based on voter registration numbers; drafted and passed as a law.
26 June 2023—22 August 2023: Candidate registration.
26 June—15 July (20 days): Candidates for president and National Assembly.
3 August—22 August (20 days): Candidates for provincial assemblies and commune councils.
19 November 2023—18 December 2023: Electoral campaigns.
19 November: Start of 30 day campaigns for president, National Assembly, and provincial assemblies.
4 December: Start of 15 day campaigns for commune councils.
20 December 2023: Election day.
20 January 2024: Presidential swearing in ceremony.

Electoral system
The president is elected by plurality voting in one round.

The 500 members of the National Assembly are elected by two methods. In electoral districts having been allocated only one seat, members are elected using first-past-the-post voting; while in those allocated multiple seats, the members are elected by open list proportional representation, with seats assigned using the largest remainder method.  Proportional allocation of seats to electoral districts will be finalized by 15 June 2023. For the 2018 elections there were 62 single member constituencies with the remaining 438 members elected from multi-member ones.

The provincial assembly elections also use the same two methods for electing members.  For the commune councils all members of a council are in a single multi-member district and are elected using the open list method.

References

Future elections in Africa
Democratic Republic of the Congo general election
General election
Elections in the Democratic Republic of the Congo
Presidential elections in the Democratic Republic of the Congo